Harm van Riel (18 February 1907 – 13 December 1980) was a Dutch politician of the People's Party for Freedom and Democracy (VVD) and businessman.

Career
He served as a Member of the Senate from 6 November 1956 until 5 June 1963, and from 2 July 1963 until 3 June 1976. He was the Parliamentary leader of People's Party for Freedom and Democracy in the Senate from 24 March 1959 until 3 June 1976. A colourful politician, he was a mentor to former Party Leader of the People's Party for Freedom and Democracy Hans Wiegel during his leadership.

Decorations

References

External links

Official
  Mr. H. (Harm) van Riel Parlement & Politiek
  Mr. H. van Riel (VVD) Eerste Kamer der Staten-Generaal

 

1907 births
1980 deaths
Dutch bankers
Dutch jurists
Dutch political writers
Freedom Party (Netherlands) politicians
Knights of the Order of the Netherlands Lion
Leiden University alumni
Members of the Senate (Netherlands)
Members of the Provincial Council of South Holland
Members of the Provincial-Executive of South Holland
People's Party for Freedom and Democracy politicians
People from Emmen, Netherlands
People from Haarlemmermeer
Vice Chairmen of the People's Party for Freedom and Democracy
20th-century Dutch businesspeople
20th-century Dutch male writers
20th-century Dutch politicians